Blakiston is a surname. Notable people with the surname include:

 Bob Blakiston (1855-1918), American Major League Baseball outfielder
 Caroline Blakiston (1933-), English actress
 Charles Blakiston (1825–1898), New Zealand politician
 Herbert Edward Douglas Blakiston (1862–1942), President of Trinity College, Oxford, Vice-Chancellor of Oxford University
 John Blakiston (1603–1649), English MP, coal merchant and one of the regicides of King Charles I
 John Blakiston-Houston (1829-1920), Irish member of parliament
 Matthew Blakiston (1702–1774), Lord Mayor of London, 1st Baronet of London
 Nathaniel Blakiston (died 1722), Royal Governor of the Maryland colony from 1698 to 1702
 Nehemiah Blakiston, Royal Governor of the Maryland colony from 1691 to 1692
 Oswell Blakeston,  pseudonym of Henry Joseph Hasslacher (1907–1985), writer, artist and poet
 Thomas Blakiston (1832-1891), English explorer and naturalist

See also
Blakiston baronets